Miķeļtornis (Livonian: Pizā)  is a populated place in Tārgale parish, Ventspils municipality, Latvia. It is one of the twelve Livonian villages on the Livonian Coast.

Miķeļbāka 

Lighthouse "Miķeļbāka" established in 1884 is located nearby. The present  lighthouse tower was built in 1957. It is the highest lighthouse in the three Baltic states, and is located about 7.5 miles west of Lielirbe at 57°36′N, 21°53′E.

See also
Livonian people

References

External links

Towns and villages in Latvia
Ventspils Municipality